Nels Johnson (1838–1915) was a Danish-American professional mechanic and engineer. Johnson died in Manistee on January 20, 1915 at the age of 76.

References

Sources

Further reading 
 Johnson autobiography 1914, History of the Life of Nels Johnson.

1838 births
1915 deaths
American clockmakers
19th-century American inventors
Danish emigrants to the United States
People from Manistee, Michigan
Businesspeople from Milwaukee
People from Slagelse Municipality
19th-century American businesspeople